Cercle Athlétique de Paris Charenton is a French football club which plays in the cities of Charenton-le-Pont and Maisons-Alfort, Val-de-Marne. The team is a merge between CA Paris (founded in 1892) and SO Charentonnais (founded in 1904). The two merged in 1964.

History
CA Paris was founded in 1892 as Nationale de Saint-Mandé, a gymnastic club. In 1896, the football section was founded and took the name of FC Paris. In 1906, the club changed its name to CA Paris in a merge with l'Union Sportive de Paris XII and l'Athlétic Club. The club won the Coupe de France in 1920 and was runner-up in 1928.

The CA Paris played the first two seasons of Ligue 1 in 1932–33 and 1933–34, finishing last with only ten points in 1934. The team remained in league from 1934 to 1963 (except World War II), when it dropped its professional status in 1963. The team merged with SO Charentonnais in 1964 and now plays at a regional level.

Honours
 Coupe de France: 1920

Notable players

Managerial history
 Alfred Aston 1948–1949
 Albert Dubreucq
 Dominique Mori (1955–1958)
 Eugène Proust (1958– 1959)
 Angelo Grizzetti (1959–1962)
 Ripoll (1962–1964)

References

External links

 History

 
Association football clubs established in 1896
Football clubs in Paris
1896 establishments in France
Sport in Val-de-Marne
Ligue 1 clubs